Tanyochraethes smithi is a species of beetle in the family Cerambycidae. It was described by Chemsak and Linsley in 1965.

References

Clytini
Beetles described in 1965